Legislative Assembly elections were held in Goa on 16 November 1994 to elect all 40 members of the Goa Legislative Assembly.

Results

Elected members

References

State Assembly elections in Goa
Goa